Yvette Marie Valdez Bautista (born 16 October 1973) is an American-born Mexican football manager and former player, who played as a goalkeeper. She has been a member of the Mexico women's national team.

High school and college career
Valdez attended the San Joaquin Memorial High School, the Fresno City College and the University of the Pacific. She graduated from the latter in 1997 with a degree in sports medicine.

Club career
Valdez has played for the California Storm for eight seasons.

International career
Valdez was included in the Mexico squad for the 1999 FIFA Women's World Cup, but made no appearances during the tournament.

Managerial career
Valdez worked as a coach of the San Joaquin Memorial High School women's team from 1992 to 1994. Two years later, she became an assistant coach for the Pacific Tigers and lasted there until 2002, primarily as a goalkeeping coach. In 2003, she joined as an assistant coach for the Arizona Wildcats women's soccer team.

References

1973 births
Living people
Citizens of Mexico through descent
Women's association football goalkeepers
Female association football managers
Women's association football managers
Mexican women's footballers
Mexico women's international footballers
1999 FIFA Women's World Cup players
Mexican football managers
American women's soccer players
Soccer players from California
Sportspeople from Fresno, California
American sportspeople of Mexican descent
Fresno City College alumni
Pacific Tigers women's soccer players
USL W-League (1995–2015) players
Women's Premier Soccer League players
California Storm players
American women's soccer coaches
Pacific Tigers women's soccer coaches
Arizona Wildcats women's soccer coaches